Eli Chaim Carlebach (1925-1990) was a rabbi and spiritual leader.

Biography 
He was born in 1925, to Hartwig Naftali Carlebach and Paula (Pesse) Cohn. He was the twin brother of Shlomo Carlebach. The Carlebach family is a notable Jewish family originally from Germany that now lives all over the world. He studied at Yeshiva Mesivta Torah Vodaas, in Brooklyn, NY.

On March 16, 1949 he married Hadassah Schneerson.  The wedding was attended by many great rabbis, including Rabbi Eliezer Silver. Hadassa's father, Schneour Zalman Schneersohn, was a first cousin of Levi Yitzchak Schneerson, the father of the 7th Lubavitcher Rebbe, Menachem Mendel Schneerson, who said the first 2 blessings under his wedding chupah. Hadassah  is a second cousin of Menachem Mendel Schneerson.

His daughter Sterna Citron wrote a book about her fathers stories.

Career
After his father's death in 1967, Eli and his brother assumed the position of spiritual leaders of the Congregation Kehilath Jacob (Founded in 1945), the landmarked  "Carlebach Shul," located in the Upper West Side of Manhattan.  The synagogue was famous for its worshippers, young and old, female and male, traditional and liberal who participated in services there.

His grandson, Rabbi Naftali Citron, is the current Rabbi there.

He was also the rabbi at the Hillside Jewish Center in New Jersey.

He died of a heart attack at the age of 65.

See also
 Ephraim Carlebach

References

External links
 The Carlebach Shul

1925 births
1990 deaths
American Orthodox rabbis
Eli Chaim Carlebach
Jewish emigrants from Nazi Germany to the United States
20th-century American rabbis
 
Beth Medrash Govoha alumni